Helena Spajić (born 8 February 2000) is a Croatian footballer who plays as a midfielder and has appeared for the Croatia women's national team.

Career
Spajić has been capped for the Croatia national team, appearing for the team during the 2019 FIFA Women's World Cup qualifying cycle.

References

External links
 
 
 

2000 births
Living people
Croatian women's footballers
Croatia women's international footballers
Women's association football midfielders